Emmanuel "Manny" Mijares is a multi-platinum songwriter and executive producer. He is best known as a co-writer on the hit single What A Feeling as performed by Kelly Rowland of the pop group Destiny's Child as well as the first US dance single by CNN Artist of the Year Ricky J. He is the founder of the independent record label "Upscale Records", a division of his production company "Upscale Recording & Productions". In 2008, Mijares established Big Talent Showcase, a company which helps new aspiring talents showcase their abilities to those in the entertainment industry.

Early life and career 
Manny Mijares was born in Orange County, CA the son of Elizabeth Elias and Edwin Soto Mijares. Mijares's parents are Hispanic and Native American. He has two younger brothers, Jacob "Jake" Johnston and Nathan "Nate" Johnston. One younger sister Sarah Kuntz. As a pre-teen, Mijares was introduced to music production after participating in a music-based church where he revised lyrics. He began working as a studio professional in 2000 and is currently active today . Since the start of his career, Mijares has been involved in the production and/or management aspects of several Billboard Magazine charted hit singles as listed below.

Upscale Records 
In 2001 Manny Mijares founded Upscale Recording & Productions as the Executive Producer. URP is an Audio, Video and Event Production company with its own record label and talent roster. As an independently owned company, Manny has focused on developing artists that he is most passionate about.

Philanthropy 
In 2013, Manny Mijares founded the Changing Fate Foundation to help kids and teens overcome difficult circumstances. The goal of the foundation is "We are passionate about guiding those that come from broken families, abuse or bad circumstances to help give them a second chance. We are dedicated to helping kids and teens between 12-20 by getting them the things they need to get back on track and redirect them towards a better, brighter future."

Recordings produced

References

External links 
Upscale Records
Upscale Recording
Changing Fate
Big Talent Showcase
Mijares Group

People from Orange County, California
Living people
1978 births